The Ergilian age is a period of geologic time (37.2–33.9 Ma) within the Late Eocene epoch of the Paleogene used more specifically with Asian Land Mammal Ages. It follows the Ulangochuian and precedes the Houldjinian age.

The Ergilian's lower boundary is the approximate base of the Priabonian age and approximate upper base of the Rupelian age. The Ergilian age is named after the Ergilian-Dzo fossil formations in Mongolia.

Eocene